Casey Mongillo   is an American voice actor, who has played roles in animation and video games. Mongillo is best known for portraying lead character Shinji Ikari in the Netflix English dub of Neon Genesis Evangelion in 2019, and has also played Emporio Alniño in JoJo's Bizarre Adventure: Stone Ocean, Shou Suzuki in Mob Psycho 100, and Raichu, Scorbunny, Raboot, Cinderace, Chrysa, and Allister in the Pokémon anime.

Career
In 2019, Mongillo voiced the main character Shinji Ikari in the Netflix dub of the anime series Neon Genesis Evangelion, replacing Spike Spencer, who played the part in the original ADV Films dub. Mongillo tweeted that playing Shinji was "one of the greatest honors of my life".

Noel Kirkpatrick of TV Guide praised Mongillo's portrayal of Shinji, saying they excelled at switching "between sarcasm and sadness, delight and detachment", and that they did "a better job of capturing Shinji's pre-teen voice" than Spencer. Aja Romano of Vox wrote that it was laudable that Netflix cast a non-binary actor to play Shinji. Carol Grant, in an opinion piece for Vice'', wrote that Shinji being played by a trans actor made the series feel more queer, saying that "Mongillo's delivery captures the delicate interplay between the masculine and feminine aspects of Shinji's voice and personality, bringing his bodily and gendered anxieties to life".

Mongillo was nominated for Best Performance by a Voice Actor (English) in the Crunchyroll Anime Awards for their performance as Shinji.

Mongillo released a single, "Everything Is Alright", on the iTunes Store on April 3, 2012.

Filmography

Anime

Animation

Video games

Other dubbing

Discography
"Everything Is Alright" (2012 single)

References

External links
 
 
 
 

Actors from Hartford, Connecticut
American voice actors
American video game actors
Living people
LGBT people from Connecticut
American non-binary actors
People with non-binary gender identities
LGBT people from California
Year of birth missing (living people)
21st-century LGBT people